Nkosingiphile Nhlakanipho Ngcobo (born 16 November 1999), nicknamed Mshini is a South African footballer who plays for Kaizer Chiefs. 

He played in the 2016 COSAFA U-20 Cup, the 2017 COSAFA U-20 Cup and later the 2019 Africa U-20 Cup of Nations, where he was named to the CAF Best XI.

References

1999 births
Living people
South African soccer players
Association football midfielders
Kaizer Chiefs F.C. players
South African Premier Division players
Footballers at the 2020 Summer Olympics
Olympic soccer players of South Africa
South Africa under-20 international soccer players
Sportspeople from Pietermaritzburg